The Pakistan national cricket team toured India in the 1998–99 season. The two teams played two Tests. Test series was drawn 1–1. The teams were originally scheduled to play three Tests but, the third Test became part of the 1998–99 Asian Test Championship.

Test series

1st Test

2nd Test

References

Further reading

External links
 Tour home at ESPN Cricinfo
 Pakistan to India 1998-99 at test-cricket-tours.co.uk
 

1999 in Indian cricket
Indian cricket seasons from 1970–71 to 1999–2000
International cricket competitions from 1997–98 to 2000
1998–99
1999 in Pakistani cricket